Tor Łódź is a motorsport race track located in the Kiełmina, Poland, a suburb of Łódź. It is the first Driving Technique Improvement Center (ODTJ) in the Łódź Voivodeship. It was entered into the ODTJ register by the Łódź Voivode in 2017 under the number 002E.

Characteristics
Tor Łódź is located in a fenced area of 6 hectares, which also houses a building with a conference room and a café. The asphalt track itself is 1,500 m long, 8-12 m wide and consists of 17 curves, including a section of sprinkled curves and two skid plates: a rectangular one and a segment of the ring.a

At Tor Łódź, training courses are conducted to improve driving techniques for drivers of passenger cars from category B, B1 and for motorcyclists.

References

Sport in Łódź Voivodeship
Buildings and structures in Łódź Voivodeship
Motorsport venues in Poland